The 2019 Michelin Ginetta Junior Championship was a multi-event, one make motor racing championship held across England and Scotland. The championship featured a mix of professional motor racing teams and privately funded drivers, aged between 14 and 17, competing in Ginetta G40s that conformed to the technical regulations for the championship. It forms part of the extensive program of support categories built up around the British Touring Car Championship centrepiece. It was the thirteenth Ginetta Junior Championship, and the first with new title sponsor Michelin, commencing on 6 April 2019 at Brands Hatch – on the circuit's Indy configuration – and concluding on 13 October 2019 at the same venue, utilising the Grand Prix circuit, after ten meetings, all in support of the 2019 British Touring Car Championship.

Teams and Drivers

Race Calendar

Championship standings

Drivers' championship
A driver's best 24 scores counted towards the championship, with any other points being discarded.

References

External links
 
 Ginetta Junior Series News

Ginetta Junior Championship season
Ginetta Junior Championship seasons